Al-Salihiyah or al-Salhiya is a residential neighborhood and a subject of Baladiyah al-Batha in Riyadh, Saudi Arabia. Spread across 48 hectares, it shares borders with al-Oud neighborhood to the west and Sinaiyah Qadeem to the east. The locality is mostly inhabited by overseas workers of various nationalities, including Yemenis and Indians.

References 

Neighbourhoods in Riyadh